Dardarina is a genus of skippers in the family Hesperiidae. Species of the genus are found in Central America and parts of South America.

Species
Recognised species in the genus Dardarina include:
 Dardarina dardaris (Hewitson, 1877) - Mexico
 Dardarina daridaeus (Godman, 1900) - Brazil

References

External links
Natural History Museum Lepidoptera genus database

Heteropterinae
Hesperiidae genera